Alfred Au (14 December 1898 – 27 October 1986) was a German international footballer.

References

1898 births
1986 deaths
German footballers
Association football midfielders
Germany international footballers
20th-century German people